Stolidoptera tachasara is a moth of the family Sphingidae first described by Herbert Druce in 1888.

Distribution 
It is found in Mexico and Central America, as well as Venezuela in northern South America. It has also been spotted in Bolivia.

Description 
The wingspan is 79–92 mm.

Biology 
Adults are on wing nearly year round (except March and December) in Costa Rica.

The larvae have been recorded feeding on Thalia geniculata and Prunus annularis.

References

Dilophonotini
Moths described in 1888
Sphingidae of South America
Moths of South America